is a Japanese poet and translator who was born in Vancouver, British Columbia, Canada. She is a modernist, outsider poet who got her start in Katsue Kitazono's "VOU" poetry group, which led Shiraishi to publish her first book of poems in 1951. She has  also read her poetry at jazz performances. She has appeared at readings and literary festivals all over the world.

Kenneth Rexroth called her "the Allen Ginsberg of Japan," and edited a volume of her poetry in English for New Directions Press.

Translations available in English
Hiroaki Sato has translated Shiraishi's poetry for BOMB Magazine,  and 
several of her anthologies have appeared in English:

 Seasons of Sacred Lust. Translated by Ikuko Atsumi, John Solt, Carol Tinker, Yasuyo Morita, and Kenneth Rexroth. Edited by Kenneth Rexroth. New Directions Press, 1975. 
 Let Those Who Appear. Translated by Samuel Grolmes and Yumiko Tsumura. New Directions Press, 2002. 
 My Floating Mother, City. Translated by Samuel Grolmes and Yumiko Tsumura. New Directions Press, 2009.
 Sea, Land, Shadow. Translated by Yumiko Tsumura. New Directions Press, 2017.

References

Further reading
''Quarterly Conversation''. "My Floating Mother, City by Kazuko Shiraishi," by Levi Stahl.

1931 births
Living people
Writers from Vancouver
Japanese poets
Japanese translators
Japanese women poets
Date of birth missing (living people)
International Writing Program alumni